Burdettia is a genus of moths of the family Noctuidae.

Species
Burdettia braziliensis  (Schaus, 1904)
Burdettia lignealisoides  Poole, 1989
Burdettia rivalis  (Schaus, 1904)

References
Natural History Museum Lepidoptera genus database

Calpinae